Parliamentary elections were held in the People's Republic of Albania on 28 May 1954.
The Democratic Front was the only party able to contest the elections, and subsequently won all 134 seats. Voter turnout was reported to be 99.9%.

Results

References

Parliamentary elections in Albania
Albania
1954 in Albania
One-party elections
Albania